Look Back may refer to:

Look Back, film with Natalia Bardo, 2014
Look Back, film with Gregory Blair, 2016
Look Back (manga), a Japanese one-shot web manga by Tatsuki Fujimoto, July 2021
"Look Back" (Tone Damli song), by Norwegian singer Tone Damli, 2012
"Look Back" (Diplo song), by American DJ Diplo from the album California,  2018
 Lookback option, a type of finance option

See also 
 Don't Look Back (disambiguation)
 Lookback distance, a type of astronomical distance

 Looking Back (disambiguation)